"Sácala a Bailar" (English: "Ask Her To Dance") is a song by Peruvian singer-songwriter Gian Marco released by Enjoymusic as the third single of his thirteenth studio album Intuición.

Release and reception
The song was released on January 18, 2019 on all digital platforms. The song was well received and was considered as one of the best songs of the summer in Perú. The video for the song was released on the same day, filmed in Callao, and was produced by Tondero. The video went viral and was trending in Perú. It is considered as one of the best songs from the album. 

Gian Marco stated that he was not going to try urban music like most artists and decided to go for a tropical sound instead when he released this song. While some people applauded Gian Marco for releasing a catchy song, others accused him of caving into the reggaeton genre which he quickly denied stating that that's a genre that he will never do in his life and that the song it's actually a tropical song.

Music video
The video was released the same day as the song on Gian Marco's official channel. The video shows Gian Marco playing his guitar and singing the song at different parties while a couple of guys see a pretty girl and follow her to try to ask her to dance but something always prevents them from asking her. The video was filmed in Unidad Modelo, La Punta, and Callao Monumental. The video stars former Miss Peru winner, Natalie Vértiz.

Charts

Weekly charts

Year-end charts

Awards and nominations
The song was nominated in for Song of the Year and Best Pop/Urban Song at the Premios Fama in 2019.

References

Gian Marco songs
2019 singles
Spanish-language songs
2019 songs
Songs written by Gian Marco